Scythris rivigera is a moth of the family Scythrididae. It was described by Edward Meyrick in 1911. It is found in Namibia, South Africa (Limpopo, Gauteng), Zimbabwe and Yemen.

References

rivigera
Moths described in 1911